Matamata Airport  is the airport serving Matamata, New Zealand.

It has two grass runways.

References

Airports in New Zealand
Geography of Waikato
Matamata
1942 establishments in New Zealand
Transport buildings and structures in Waikato